"Unskinny Bop" is a song by American glam metal band Poison, released as the first single from their third studio album, Flesh & Blood (1990), on June 18, 1990. The song peaked at number three on the US Billboard Hot 100, number five on the Billboard Album Rock Tracks chart, and number three on the Canadian and New Zealand charts. It also entered the top 20 in Australia, Sweden, and the United Kingdom.

Background
The meaning of "Unskinny Bop" has always been shrouded in obscurity. C.C. DeVille later confessed that the phrase "unskinny bop" has no particular meaning: he invented it as a temporary measure while writing the song, before vocalist Bret Michaels had begun working on the lyrics. The phrase was used on the basis that it was phonetically suited to the music. The song was later played to producer Bruce Fairbairn, who stated that, although he did not know what an "unskinny bop" was, the phrase was perfect.

Music video
The music video for the song has Bret Michaels, dancing with a couple of animated neon cowgirls next to him.

Track listings
7-inch and cassette single
 "Swampjuice (Soul-O)" – 1:26
 "Unskinny Bop" – 3:47
 "Valley of Lost Souls" – 5:37

12-inch and CD single
 "Swampjuice (Soul-O)" – 1:26
 "Unskinny Bop" – 3:47
 "Valley of Lost Souls" – 5:37
 "Poor Boy Blues" – 5:19

Japanese mini-CD single
 "Unskinny Bop"
 "Valley of Lost Souls"

Charts

Weekly charts

Year-end charts

Decade-end charts

Certifications

See also
 List of glam metal albums and songs

References

Poison (American band) songs
1990 singles
1990 songs
Capitol Records singles
Enigma Records singles
Song recordings produced by Bruce Fairbairn
Songs written by Bobby Dall
Songs written by Bret Michaels
Songs written by C.C. DeVille
Songs written by Rikki Rockett